Guerdy Jacques Preval (born March, 1950 in Port-au-Prince, Haiti) is a Haitian-Canadian painter. He now lives and works in Montreal, Quebec,  Canada.

Life 
Guerdy Jacques Preval was born in Port-au-Prince, Haiti in 1950. At a young age, he began taking summer classes in ceramics and, then in painting at the workshop Poto-Mitan led by painters Tiga and Dorcély. Later, at the Athenaeum Studio Art, he continued his apprenticeship under the supervision of Emmanuel Pierre-Charles and Valentin Iviquel who quickly became his friends.

In 1972, he emigrated to Montreal. In conjunction with his activities as an artist, he obtained a Bachelor of Arts and a Master of Art Studies at the Université du Québec à Montréal (UQAM). In 2001, he exhibited his work at the 49th edition of the Venice Biennale Contemporary Arts.

Works 
The painting of Guerdy J. Preval, according to the art historian Carlo A. Célius, "manifests […] a passion for beautiful shapes, bright colors, a drawing virtuosity and skill in a spatial environment, which, however, never form a pure formalism."

Indeed, there is in the painting of Préval a permanent tension between the figurative and the abstract, which aims only toward one objective: to break with a certain classicism. There are so many moments that troubled areas are deaf or silent. Sometimes, they try to identify the principles of strength and fragility of humans. Sometimes, they evoke historical event of the home country, in particular. These echoes of a scarred land, Haiti, are major contributors to the aesthetics of Preval.

However, Préval remains "a painter of the body." "It's on the body, according to Carlo A. Célius that prove two other main characteristics of his work: eroticism and dreamlike, the first as format and the second as layout. The body, mostly female, erotic in its posture, its forms, symbols and situations associated suggested rises, acts, moves into a dreamy space… "

He had the privilege of exhibiting, in solo and group exhibitions, his work around the world, especially in Hong Kong, Paris, Venice, Rome, Montreal, Toronto, New York City, Miami, Boston, Santo Domingo, Port-au-Prince and Lagos. His works are included in several publications, including the Canadian guide to visual arts, Le Guide Vallée.

In addition, Guerdy Jacques Preval is pursuing research on the popular Haitian cultural  expressions that he regularly publishes in the form of books and articles.
 
The artist, who still lives in Montreal after several attempts to return home, has won several awards and grants to support his creativity from both federal and provincial levels of the Canadian government.

Prizes and awards 
2001 Exhibition at the 49th edition of the Venice Biennale Contemporary Arts

1980 Only contemporary artist who exhibited his works at Place Royale, Quebec, Canada

1976 Second Winner at "Gouverneurs de la Rosée" Concours, Port-au-Prince, Haïti

Exhibitions 
 Some Personal Exhibitions

2003 "Entretien", Gallery Entre-Cadre (Montreal, Canada)

1995 "Peinture en extase", Gallery Entre-Cadre (Montreal, Canada)

1994 "Souvenirs ankylosés", Gallery Entre-Cadre (Montreal, Canada)

1990 "Nuances", French Institute (Port-au-Prince, Haiti)

1985 La Ataranza (Santo Domingo, Dominican Republic)

1980 Place Royale, Quebec, Canada

1980 "Haiti-Diaspora", Quebec University in Montreal (Montreal, Canada)

1979 Complexe Desjardins (Montreal, Canada)

1974 Mont-Tremblant (Quebec, Canada)

1972 Athénée Studio Art (Port-au-Prince, Haiti)

1969 Académie des Beaux-Arts (Port-au-Prince, Haiti)

 Some Collective Exhibitions

2005 Art Off the Main, Puck Building (New York, USA)
 
2004 Art Off the Main, Puck Building (New York, USA)

2004 Bank Street College of Education (New York, USA)

2001 49th edition of the Venice Biennale Contemporary Arts (Venice, Italy)
 
2001 "Voodoo's Painters", Istituto Italo-Latino-Americano (Rome, Italy)

2000 Bergeron Gallery (Ottawa, Canada)
 
1999 Gallerie Carmel (Ottawa, Canada)
 
1989 "Festival Gallery" (Haiti)

1987 "Contemporary Art at Grand Palais" (Paris, France)
 
1986 UNESCO (New York, USA)

1983 International Festival of Arts (Montreal, Canada)

1977 Lee Garden (Hong Kong, China)

1976 United Nations (New York, USA)

1976 "Gouverneurs de la Rosée" Concours, Galerie Nader (Port-au-Prince, Haiti)

1975 Columbia University’s "New York World Fair" (New York, USA)
 
1969 Académie des Beaux-Arts (Port-au-Prince, Haiti)

Publications 
 Proverbes haïtiens illustrés, National Museums of Canada, Ottawa, 1985.
 Gérard Dupervil ou La Voix d'une génération, Ilan-Ilan éditeur, Sherbrooke, 1995. 
 La Musique populaire haïtienne de l'ère coloniale à nos jours, éditions Histoires Nouvelles, Montréal, 2003.
 Histoire d'Haïti : la nôtre, éditions Histoires Nouvelles, Montréal, 2008.
 Histoire de la culture haïtienne, éditions Histoires Nouvelles, Montréal, 2012.
 Dialogue avec l'Histoire. Tome I. Pour mieux connaître le vrai visage de l'occupation américaine, de 1915 à nos jours, éditions Histoires Nouvelles, Montréal, 2017.
 Dialogue avec l'Histoire. Tome II. De la Croix du débarquement de Christophe Colomb et le pourquoi du débarquement des Marines américains, éditions Histoires Nouvelles, Montréal, 2017.
 D'un royaume à l'autre : le roi Coupé Cloué et ses héroïnes, éditions Histoires Nouvelles, Montréal, 2018.

References
 Bloncourt, Gérald et Nadal-Gardère, Marie-José, Haitian Arts/La Peinture haïtienne, éditions Nathan, Paris, 1986.
 Lerebours, Michel-Philippe, Haïti et ses peintres de 1804 à 1980 : Souffrances et espoirs d'un peuple, Imprimeur II, Port-au-Prince, 1989.
 Guide Vallée : Biographies et cotes de 1000 artistes, édition II, Félix Vallée éditeur, Montréal, 1989.
 Guide Vallée : Biographies et cotes de 1570 artistes, édition III, Félix Vallée éditeur, Montréal, 1993.

Links and external documents 
 Painter's personal website (biography, style, exhibitions and painting gallery) 
 Presentation of the painter (biography, style and painting gallery) by EMIE Cultural Arts Council Inc. of New York 
 Painter's page in Indexweb.info directory 
 Index of Canadian Artists (Visual Arts) 

Haitian painters
Haitian male painters
20th-century Canadian painters
Canadian male painters
21st-century Canadian painters
1950 births
Living people
Artists from Montreal
Haitian emigrants to Canada
Black Canadian artists
People from Port-au-Prince
20th-century Canadian male artists
21st-century Canadian male artists